Rowland Ponsonby Blennerhassett KC, JP (22 July 1850 – 7 April 1913) was an Irish politician.

Early life
He was the only son of Richard Francis Blennerhassett and his wife Honoria Ponsonby, daughter of William Carrique Ponsonby. Blennerhassett was educated at Trinity College, Dublin and at Christ Church, Oxford.

Career
In a by-election in 1872, he entered the British House of Commons and sat as Member of Parliament (MP) for Kerry until 1885. Blennerhassett was called to the bar by the Inner Temple in 1878, and in April 1894 became bencher and a King's Counsel. He was a Justice of the Peace for Kerry.

Personal life
On 21 September 1876, he married Mary Beatrice Armstrong, youngest daughter of the art historian Walter Armstrong. They had one son. Mary Beatrice is buried in the Armstrong family vault on the inside of the Lebanon Circle in Highgate Cemetery.

References

External links

1850 births
1913 deaths
Members of the Inner Temple
Members of the Parliament of the United Kingdom for County Kerry constituencies (1801–1922)
UK MPs 1868–1874
UK MPs 1874–1880
UK MPs 1880–1885
Rowland